Ælfhere
 Ælfric
 Ælfweard
 Æthelwine
 Æthelwulf
 Alphege (originally Ælfheah)
 Beorhtric
 Eadric Streona
 Eadwig
 Ealdgyth
 Ealhhelm
 Ealhswith
 Goda
 Godwin
 Leofric
 Leofwine
 Morcar
 Northman
 Wulfric Spot

Sources 

Anglo-Saxon Mercians
Mercians